János Harmatta (2 October 1917 – 24 July 2004) was a Hungarian linguist. He deciphered the Parthian ostraca and papyri of Dura Europos and was the first to decipher a major Bactrian inscription.

He taught as a professor at the Hungarian Academy of Sciences.

Literary works
 Harmatta János (1917-): Forrástanulmányok Herodotos Skythika-jához = Quellenstudien zu den Skythika des Herodot / irta Harmatta János

References and sources
References

Sources
 Harmatta János (1917-): Forrástanulmányok Herodotos Skythika-jához = Quellenstudien zu den Skythika des Herodot / irta Harmatta János
 Ferenczy Endre (1912-1990): Az ókori Róma története : [egyetemi tankönyv] / Ferenczy Endre, Maróti Egon, Hahn István ; szerk. Harmatta János
 Szabó Miklós (1940-): Hellasz fénykora : Görögország az i.e. V. században / Szabó Miklós ; [a szövegben szereplő prózai idézetek Devecseri Gábor et al. fordításai]
 Studies in the sources on the history of Pre-Islamic Central Asia / [by R. Ghirshman ... et al.] ; ed. by J. Harmatta
 Prolegomena to the sources on the history of Pre-Islamic Central Asia / [by P. Aalto ... et al.] ; ed. by J. Harmatta

Linguists from Hungary
Iranologists
1917 births
2004 deaths
Herder Prize recipients
20th-century linguists
Hungarian classical scholars